Vestia is a genus of air-breathing land snails, terrestrial pulmonate gastropod mollusks in the family Clausiliidae, the door snails, all of which have a clausilium.

Paul Hesse named Vestia as a nomen novum for Uncinaria , which was preoccupied by its senior homonym Uncinaria , a genus of nematode.

Species
Species:

Vestia elata 
Vestia gulo 
Vestia lazarovii 
Vestia pavlovici 
Vestia ranojevici 
Vestia roschitzi 
Vestia turgida

References

 Nomenclator Zoologicus info

External links

Clausiliidae
Gastropod genera